The 1991 FIVB Volleyball Boys' U19 World Championship was held in Porto, Portugal for eight days, from 07 to 14 December 1991. This was the second edition of the tournament.



Competition formula
The 12 teams were divided into two pools of six teams each and played a round-robin tournament. The top two teams of each pool progressed to the semifinals.

Pools composition

Final round

1st–4th places

Semifinals

|}

3rd place match

|}

Final

|}

Final standing

See also
1991 FIVB Girls' U18 World Championship

References

External links
Results

FIVB Volleyball Boys' U19 World Championship
Sports competitions in Porto
2009 in Portuguese sport
International volleyball competitions hosted by Portugal